Sim Woo-jun (born April 28, 1995) is the infielder of KT Wiz of the KBO League. He was the national representative of the 26th World Youth Baseball Championships. He graduated Kyunggi High School.

He had a walk-off hit against Son Seung-rak against Lotte on July 29, 2016.

References 

1995 births
Living people
KBO League players
KT Wiz players
Baseball players from Seoul
South Korean baseball players